Fruli, Früli, or Van Diest Fruli is a strawberry-favoured Belgian fruit beer, made at a craft brewery near Ghent by Brouwerij Huyghe. It is produced by blending Belgian wheat beer (70%) and pure strawberries (30%), and has 4.1% alcohol by volume.

Awards
Früli won the gold medal at the UK's Food & Drink Expo in 2004. In 2009, it was announced as the "Worlds Best Fruit Beer" by the judges of the World Beer Awards.

See also
 List of strawberry dishes
 List of strawberry topics

References

External links
 

Beer in Belgium
Strawberries